Nico Johan van der Hoogt (born 19 February 1991) is a South African professional rugby union player who plays for the Leopards in the Currie Cup & The Rugby Challenge in South Africa. He can play as a loose-forward or lock.

Career

Limpopo

In 2007, he represented them at the Under-16 Grant Khomo Week, while he also player in South Africa's premier schools tournament, the Under-18 Craven Week competition, in both 2008 and 2009.

Golden Lions / UJ

He made seven appearances for the  side in the 2010 Under-19 Provincial Championship. He was named in their squad for the 2011 Vodacom Cup competition, but failed to make an appearance. He did make two appearances for the  side in the 2011 Under-21 Provincial Championship in the latter half of the year though.

He made one further appearance, coming on as a replacement in their quarter-final match against , but once again ending on the losing side as the side from Cape Town ran out 58–34 winners. He was a regular for the s during the 2012 Under-21 Provincial Championship, appearing in eleven of their matches.

In 2013, he represented university side  in the 2013 Varsity Cup, making six appearances as they reached the Semi-final of the competition.

UFS Shimlas / Griffons

Van der Hoogt moved to the Free State in 2014 to represent  in the 2014 Varsity Cup, making five appearances off the bench as they failed to reach the semi-finals.

He retained his place in the starting line-up for the remainder of the regular season, helping them to a second-placed finish on the log.

He played in two matches for them during the regular season, which saw Shimlas end that stage of the competition unbeaten, winning six matches and drawing their match against . Van der Hoogt also scored a try in their 44–24 victory over defending champions, . He also started their semi-final match against the same opposition, helping them to a 21–10 victory to help their reach their first ever final in the competition.

References

South African rugby union players
Living people
1991 births
Rugby union players from Pretoria
Rugby union locks
Rugby union flankers
Rugby union number eights
Golden Lions players
Griffons (rugby union) players
Leopards (rugby union) players